Jasper County is a county located in the U.S. state of Illinois. According to the 2010 census, it has a population of 9,698. Its county seat is Newton.

History
Jasper County was formed in 1831 out of Clay and Crawford Counties. It was named for Sgt. William Jasper, a Revolutionary War hero from South Carolina. During the defense of Fort Moultrie in 1776, the staff of the American flag was shot away. Sgt. Jasper attached the flag to a pole and stood on the wall waving the flag at the British until a new staff was erected.

Geography

Climate and weather

Adjacent counties
 Cumberland County – north
 Clark County – northeast
 Crawford County – east
 Richland County – south
 Clay County – southwest
 Effingham County – west

Demographics

As of the 2010 United States Census, there were 9,698 people, 3,940 households, and 2,800 families living in the county. The racial makeup of the county was 98.6% white, 0.2% Asian, 0.1% American Indian, 0.1% black or African American, 0.3% from other races, and 0.6% from two or more races. Those of Hispanic or Latino origin made up 0.8% of the population. In terms of ancestry, 39.5% were German, 12.5% were American, 11.0% were Irish, and 9.1% were English.

Of the 3,940  households, 29.7% had children under the age of 18 living with them, 59.1% were married couples living together, 7.9% had a female householder with no husband present, 28.9% were non-families, and 24.5% of all households were made up of individuals. The average household size was 2.45 and the average family size was 2.90. The median age was 42.7 years.

The median income for a household in the county was $46,546 and the median income for a family was $53,034. Males had a median income of $39,167 versus $24,856 for females. The per capita income for the county was $21,467. About 6.3% of families and 8.5% of the population were below the poverty line, including 10.6% of those under age 18 and 5.1% of those aged 65 or over.

Education 

Jasper County is largely served by Jasper County Community Unit School District 1, which is based in its county seat, Newton. Five of the district's six schools are located in Jasper County. Saint Thomas Catholic School is a private elementary school, also in Newton.

Communities

City
 Newton (seat)

Villages
 Hidalgo
 Rose Hill
 Ste. Marie
 Wheeler
 Willow Hill
 Yale

Unincorporated communities

 Bogota
 Boos
 Hunt City
 Island Grove
 Latona
 West Liberty

Townships
Jasper County is divided into eleven townships:

 Crooked Creek
 Fox
 Grandville
 Grove
 Hunt City
 North Muddy
 Sainte Marie
 Smallwood
 South Muddy
 Wade
 Willow Hill

Notable residents
 Glenn Brummer, baseball catcher for the Major League Baseball St. Louis Cardinals and Texas Rangers; member of the 1982 World Champion Cardinals
 Irene Hunt, author of the classic Across Five Aprils
 Albert Isley, Illinois judge, lawyer, and state senator
 Burl Ives, folk singer, author, and actor
 Ross Wolf, baseball pitcher; plays for the SK Wyverns of the Korea Baseball Championship; formerly played for several Major League Baseball teams

Politics
Jasper is politically a fairly typical "anti-Yankee" Southern Illinois county. Opposition to the "Yankee" Republican Party and that party's Civil War meant that Jasper County voted solidly Democratic until isolationist sentiment drove its voters to Warren G. Harding in 1920.

Since the New Deal, the county has shown a steady trend away from the Democratic Party due to major shifts in that party's views – initially on economic policies, and since the 1990s on social issues. Only one Democrat – Lyndon Johnson in his 1964 landslide – has won a majority since 1940, and as is typical of the Upland South, Barack Obama in 2012 and Hillary Clinton did far worse than any previous Democrat.

See also
 National Register of Historic Places listings in Jasper County, Illinois

References

External links 
 Jasper County Genealogy Trails
 Jasper County Genweb
 http://www.southeastillinois.com

 
Illinois counties
1831 establishments in Illinois
Populated places established in 1831